Belarus participated in the Junior Eurovision Song Contest 2011. The Belarusian entry for the 2011 contest was selected through the national final Song for Europe, organised by the Belarusian broadcaster National State Television and Radio Company of the Republic of Belarus.

Before Junior Eurovision

Song for Europe 
The 10 acts that will participate in the national final were announced on 25 August 2011. The national final took place on 23 September 2011 in Minsk, broadcast live from BTRC. Ten acts competed, where the winner was determined by a 50/50 combination of the votes of a jury made up of music professionals and regional televoting.

Artist and song information

Lidiya Zablotskaya 
She represented Belarus in the Junior Eurovision Song Contest 2011 in Armenia with the song Angely dobra.

Lidiya participated at the national selection to Junior Eurovision Song Contest 2010 but finished fourth. In the Junior Eurovision Song Contest 2011, she got third place at finals with 99 points.

As of 2022 she now works as a cultural reporter for Belarus-1.

At Junior Eurovision

Voting

Notes

References

Junior Eurovision Song Contest
Belarus
2011